"Narrow Road" is a song by American rapper NLE Choppa, released as the fifth single from his debut studio album Top Shotta (2020). The song features American rapper Lil Baby and was produced by Quay Global.

Composition
In the song, both rappers sing about the struggles of their past and overcoming them. NLE Choppa mentions his use of drugs and its impact on his health in the chorus: "I just copped the Range Rover with some forgis / Sipping codeine, feeling like a dope fiend / He say I'm not a killer that nigga don't know me / My OG told me put in work when I was 14." In his verse, Choppa melodically raps about the what has shaped his mentality ("They tell me think smart, I know right from wrong / They say I'm going to get life with this dirty chrome).

Music video
The music video was released on October 23, 2020. It opens with NLE Choppa in the backseat of a Land Rover, telling a story of how an "OG" saved his life. He then raps, as he rides to an airport where Lil Baby is.

Charts

Certifications

References

2020 singles
2020 songs
NLE Choppa songs
Lil Baby songs
Songs written by Lil Baby
Warner Records singles
Songs written by NLE Choppa
Songs written by Quay Global
Song recordings produced by Quay Global